Eremophila lactea, commonly known as milky emu bush, is a flowering plant in the figwort family, Scrophulariaceae and is endemic to Western Australia. It is an erect shrub with its branches and leaves mostly glabrous but with white blotches due to the presence of dry resin. It is a critically endangered plant species mostly found in disturbed areas such as roadsides.

Description
Its branches are mostly glabrous and have prominent white blotches due to the presence of dried resin. The leaves are often blotched like the branches with dried resin.

The tube is pale lilac on the outside and a deeper lilac inside with light purple spots in the tube. The outside of the petal tube is densely covered with glandular hairs but the inside surface of the petal lobes is glabrous while the inside of the tube is filled with long, soft hairs. The 4 stamens are fully enclosed in the petal tube.

Taxonomy and naming
Eremophila lactea was first formally described by botanist Robert Chinnock in the journal Nuytsia in 1985. The specific epithet (lactea) is derived from the "Latin lactea, milky; referring to the extruded white resin on the branches, leaves and pedicels".

Distribution and habitat
The total known wild population in 1999 was 547 plants, growing in four roadside locations to the north of Esperance in the Mallee biogeographic region. It often grows in disturbed areas preferring sandy clay-loam. The species was declared "Rare Flora" under the Wildlife Conservation Act in 1996 and  "Critically Endangered" in 1998. Threats to the population include road maintenance activities, fire, and the illegal taking of cuttings.

Conservation status
This species is classified as "Threatened Flora (Declared Rare Flora — Extant)" by the Department of Environment and Conservation (Western Australia) and an Interim Recovery Plan has been prepared.

Use in horticulture
Milky emu bush is a useful "filler" plant as it can be damaged by wind. It can be propagated from cuttings with difficulty but can also be grafted onto Myoporum rootstock. Plants grown on their own roots will grow in alkaline soils, including heavy clay, in full sun or partial shade. The shrub is both frost and drought tolerant.

References

Eudicots of Western Australia
lactea
Endemic flora of Western Australia
Rare flora of Australia
Plants described in 1985
Taxa named by Robert Chinnock